Vincent Brockie (born 2 February 1969) is a Scottish former professional footballer. He is a former manager of Northern Premier League Division One North side Harrogate Railway Athletic.

References

External links
Vince Brockie career stats at Leeds-Fans.org.uk

1969 births
Living people
Scottish footballers
Scottish football managers
Leeds United F.C. players
Doncaster Rovers F.C. players
Association football defenders
Footballers from Greenock
English Football League players
Greenock Morton F.C. players
Harrogate Railway Athletic F.C. managers